Stockholm Västerås Airport , also known as Hässlö Flygplats, is a minor international airport located near the city of Västerås, Sweden,  west of Stockholm Municipality and Stockholm County.

History
In 1931, the area started to be used as a military airbase. In 1976, the airport, bought by the city, started to be used for civilian flights; the first route was by Scandinavian Airlines to Copenhagen.

In 2001, Ryanair started flights, the first route led to London Stansted. In 2006, Ryanair left the airport, but returned again in 2007. The same year, Scandinavian Airlines ended their flights from Västerås.

The airport played an important role during the 2014 Västmanland wildfire, serving as a base for water bombers and rescue helicopters.

On 13 May 2020, the Västerås city council decided to close down the airport, stating that the airport company should end all activities no later than 31 December 2022. This was due to annual losses and the need for annual financing from the city, worsened by the coronavirus outbreak. A local referendum was held on the matter on 21 March 2021, with the result that scheduled air traffic shall not end.

General aviation
The airport has extensive general-aviation traffic. Of the 17,737 landings in 2014, 94% constituted general aviation, according to the Swedish CAA (Transportstyrelsen). This includes hospital flights, flight training, private flights, corporate flights and air taxi. A multitude of operators are based at the airport; among these are maintenance workshops, helicopter businesses, flight schools, flight clubs and an aviation museum.

Airlines and destinations
The following airlines operate regular scheduled and charter flights at Stockholm Västerås Airport:

Statistics

Access
Travel from the airport to Stockholm Central Station may be done via Flygbussarna, private bus coach service, and takes approximately one and a half hours. There is also a local city bus to the Västerås Central Station, which has trains to Stockholm and more cities.

See also
Västmanland Wing (former Swedish Air Force wing)
List of the largest airports in the Nordic countries

References

External links

Official website

Year of establishment missing
Airports in the Stockholm region
Airports in Sweden
Buildings and structures in Västerås
Airports established in 1931
1931 establishments in Sweden
International airports in Sweden